Stawell may refer to:



People
 John Stawell (1600–1662), English MP
 Baron Stawell, a historical English barony (1683–1755 and 1760–1820)
 Ralph Stawell, 1st Baron Stawell (c. 1640–1689), son of John
 Mary Bilson-Legge, 1st Baroness Stawell (1725/26–1780)
 Henry Bilson-Legge, 2nd Baron Stawell (1757–1820)
 William Stawell (1815–1889) Australian colonial statesman

Places
 Stawell, Victoria, Australia, named after William
 Stawell Underground Physics Laboratory, located in the Stawell gold mine
 Stawell, Somerset, England

Other uses
 HMAS Stawell, a Bathurst class corvette named after the Australian settlement
 Stawell School, once a private school for girls on Mount Lofty, South Australia

See also